The Athletics competition at the 2014 Lusophone Games took place at the GMC Athletic Stadium between 23 and 27 January 2014 in Bambolim, Goa State, India.

The competition stood at a significantly lower level than the two previous editions. Arguably the strongest Lusophone nation, Brazil, did not send any competitors while Portugal only sent a few development athletes. Taking advantage of this situation, the host nation, India, topped the medal table. Most of their athletes were representatives of the state of Goa. São Tomé and Princípe was the only nation not to medal.

Medal summary

Men

Women

Medal table

Participation

 (10)
 (13)
 (2)
 (62)
 (13)
 (4)
 (8)
 (17)
 (4)
 (2)

References

External links
Report from the event
Day 1 results
Day 2 results
Day 3 results
Full results

Lusophony Games
2014 Lusofonia Games
2014
2014 Lusophony Games